East Ship Harbour is a rural community on the Eastern Shore of Nova Scotia, Canada, in the Halifax Regional Municipality. The community is located along the shores of Ship Harbour, an inlet of the Atlantic Ocean. The mi'kmaq name for the area was Tedumunaboogwek, translating to "water-worn rock".

References

Citations

Bibliography
 

Communities in Halifax, Nova Scotia
General Service Areas in Nova Scotia